Wampeewo is a neighborhood in Wakiso District, in the Central Region of Uganda.

Location
The coordinates of Wampeewo are 0°25'36.0"N, 32°35'59.0"E (Latitude:0.426681; Longitude:32.599737).

Points of interest
 Kampala–Gayaza Road passes through the middle of Wampeewo
 Wampeewo Primary School
 Wampeewo Church of Uganda Primary School
 Wampeewo Day and Boarding Primary School

References

External links
Museveni Addukiridde Esomero e Wampewo (Museveni Comes to the Aid of a School in Wampewo) in (Luganda)

Populated places in Central Region, Uganda
Wakiso District